Exeter Book Riddle 60 (according to the numbering of the Anglo-Saxon Poetic Records) is one of the Old English riddles found in the later tenth-century Exeter Book. The riddle is usually solved as 'reed pen', although such pens were not in use in Anglo-Saxon times, rather being Roman technology; but it can also be understood as 'reed pipe'.

Text

As edited by Krapp and Dobbie in the Anglo-Saxon Poetic Records series, Riddle 60 runs:

I was along the sand, near the seawall, beside the sea-surge; [I] dwelled firmly rooted in my original place. Few were any of the race of men that beheld my dwelling place in wilderness, for every dawn the dark sea surrounded me with its enveloping waves. Little did I expect that I, sooner or later, ever would speak mouthless over mead-benches, exchange words. It is somewhat a wonder, complex in the mind, for him who cannot understand such, how the point of the knife and the right hand, man’s intention and the blade, worked me with purpose, so that I would boldly disclose a verbal message for us two alone, so that other men will not know the meaning of our conversation far and wide.

There has been some debate as to whether Riddle 60 is a text in its own right: it is followed by the poem The Husband's Message and has been read as the opening to that. Most scholars agree, however, that the two texts are separate.

Sources

The text is usually thought to have been inspired by the second riddle in Symphosius's collection, whose answer is 'harundo' ('reed'). The same riddle also occurs in the Latin romance of Apollonius of Tyre:

Interpretation

Riddle 60 is generally read alongside other Anglo-Saxon riddles about writing implements, as giving an insight into Anglo-Saxon attitudes to the craft of writing generally. However, it also provides interesting links to the language and style of the so-called Old English elegies, and has recently been read as a case-study in ecocritical readings of Old English poetry, as it explores complex interactions of different assemblages of species and processes of crafting.

Digital Facsimile Edition and Translation
Foys, Martin and Smith, Kyle (eds.) Old English Poetry in Facsimile Project (Center for the History of Print and Digital Culture, University of Wisconsin-Madison, 2019-).

Recordings

 Michael D. C. Drout, 'Riddle 60', performed from the Anglo-Saxon Poetic Records edition (9 November 2007).

References

Riddles
Old English literature
Old English poetry